Ninjadelphis is an extinct genus of river dolphin from the early Miocene (Burdigalian) of Japan.

The generic name refers to the fact that the type locality, Iga, was a training center in Japan for ninja warriors.

Description
Ninjadelphis is distinguished from other allodelphinids by having a trapezoidal shaped exposure of frontals on cranial vertex, a nuchal crest partly overhanging posterior end of maxilla, a wider basioccipital, and basioccipital crests widely diverging posteriorly .

References

Fossil taxa described in 2016
Miocene cetaceans
Extinct mammals of Asia
River dolphins